The 2017 LEN Super Cup was the 36th edition of the LEN Super Cup, an annual water polo match organised by LEN and contested by the reigning champions of the two main European club competitions, the LEN Champions League and the LEN Euro Cup. The match was played Szolnok, the winners of the 2016–17 LEN Champions League, and Ferencváros, the winners of the 2016–17 LEN Euro Cup.

It was played at the Császár-Komjádi Swimming Stadium in Budapest, Hungary, on 4 November 2017.

Teams

This was the second overall all-Hungarian Super Cup.

Squads

Head coach: Sándor Cseh

Head coach: Zsolt Varga

Match

See also
 2017 Women's LEN Super Cup

References

External links
 LEN Super Cup at microplustiming.com

LEN Super Cup
S
L